WOCE may mean:

World Ocean Circulation Experiment
WOCE (FM) 101.9 in Ringgold, Georgia, USA